Oakland Plantation, originally known as the Jean Pierre Emmanuel Prud'homme Plantation, and also known as Bermuda, is a historic plantation in and unincorporated area of Natchitoches Parish, Louisiana.  Founded as a forced-labor farm worked by enslaved Black people for White owners, it is one of the nation's best and most intact examples of a French Creole cotton plantation complex. The Oakland Plantation is now owned by the National Park Service as part of the Cane River Creole National Historical Park.

It has been listed on the National Register of Historic Places since August 29, 1979. It is designated as a notable destination on the state's Louisiana African American Heritage Trail. It was designated a National Historic Landmark on January 3, 2001.

Geography
The Oakland Plantation grounds and structures are within the Cane River Creole National Historical Park, in the National Park Service's Cane River National Heritage Area. The plantation is situated on a bend of the Cane River Lake, with access by Louisiana Highway 119 in the Bermuda community near the parish seat of Natchitoches. Oakland Plantation is located near the Magnolia Plantation, which is another National Historic Landmark within the Cane River Creole National Historical Park; and the Melrose Plantation.

Oakland Plantation is associated with the Atahoe Plantation (of Natchez), which was developed by one of the Prud'homme family. The Cherokee Plantation was built by a granddaughter of Jean Pierre Emmanuel Prud'homme. It is also associated with the community of Isle Brevelle, a local Creole community.

History

19th century
The original owners, Jean-Pierre Emanuel Prud'homme and his wife Marie Catherine (Lambre) Prud'homme, completed building the Oakland Plantation house in 1821.  The family tradition claims that Oakland was one of the first plantations in the area to grow cotton on a large scale, which was cultivated and harvested by enslaved African Americans. They also raised and used farm animals, which were served by extant buildings, such as the dipping vat, the turkey shed, the mule barn, two pigeonniers, and several chicken coops.

The Prud'hommes also owned and operated a general store on the plantation, which also housed the Bermuda U.S. Post Office for many years.  The plantation flourished in the 19th century.

20th century
Descendant J. Alphonse Prud'homme won the gold medal at the 1904 World's Fair in St. Louis for growing the highest-grade cotton in the South.

The Cane River Creole National Historical Park was authorized by Congress in 1994, with support by US Senator J. Bennett Johnston (R-LA). In 1997, the National Park Service acquired the main buildings and surrounding land of Oakland Plantation for the park. The NPS has reached advanced stages in the preservation and conservation of the many outbuildings, and of the plantation house. They have completed furnishing interiors with furniture, paintings, and textiles as it was in the 1860s at the end of the antebellum plantation era.

The park's program includes interpretation of emancipation and the history of freedmen and Creoles of color, and their descendants, who lived and worked on Oakland Plantation for nearly 100 years after the American Civil War.  They were all integral to the region's community life.  The community has strongly associated the plantation with the Prud'homme family, many of whose descendants still reside in the area today.

See also
Antebellum architecture
National Register of Historic Places listings in Natchitoches Parish, Louisiana
List of National Historic Landmarks in Louisiana
Cane River National Heritage Area topics
Plantations in Louisiana

References

External links

NPS Cane River National Heritage Area: Oakland Plantation history
NPS Cane River National Heritage Area: a National Park Service Discover Our Shared Heritage Travel Itinerary

Houses completed in 1821
Plantation houses in Louisiana
Houses in Natchitoches Parish, Louisiana
Historic house museums in Louisiana
Museums in Natchitoches Parish, Louisiana
Open-air museums in Louisiana
Cane River National Heritage Area
Louisiana African American Heritage Trail
Houses on the National Register of Historic Places in Louisiana
National Historic Landmarks in Louisiana
Antebellum architecture
Creole architecture in Louisiana
National Register of Historic Places in Natchitoches Parish, Louisiana
Historic districts on the National Register of Historic Places in Louisiana
Slave cabins and quarters in the United States
1818 establishments in Louisiana
Cotton plantations in Louisiana